In mathematics, a random polytope is a structure commonly used in convex analysis  and the analysis of linear programs in d-dimensional Euclidean space . Depending on use the construction and definition, random polytopes may differ.

Definition 

There are multiple non equivalent definitions of a Random polytope. For the following definitions. Let K be a bounded convex set in a Euclidean space:
 The convex hull of random points selected with respect to a uniform distribution inside K.
 The following parameterization has been used:  such that  (Note: these polytopes can be empty).

Properties definition 1  
For a large enough  and given .

 vol  vol 
 For the unit ball , the wet part  is the annulus  where h is of order :  vol 

 .
 Note: If  (a function that returns the amount of d-1 dimensional faces), then  and formula can be evaluated for smooth convex sets and for polygons in the plane.

Properties definition 2  
Assume we are given a multivariate probability distribution on  that is

 Generates either 0 or 1 for the s with probability of  each.
 Assigns a measure of 0 to the set of elements in  that correspond to empty polytopes.

Given this distribution, and our assumptions, the following properties hold:

(Note:  where ). The upper bound, or worst case, for the number of vertices with  constraints is much larger: .
 The probability that a new constraint is redundant is: . (Note: , and as we add more constraints, the probability a new constraint is redundant approaches 100%).
 The expected number of non-redundant constraints is: ..

Example uses 

 Minimal caps
 Macbeath regions
 Approximations (approximations of convex bodies see properties of definition 1)
 Economic cap covering theorem (see relation from properties of definition 1 to floating bodies)

References 

Metric geometry
Convex analysis
Computational geometry